The Terosree massacre was the mass murder of 43 civilians by the Pakistan Army in the Manikganj District during the Bangladesh Liberation war. The name comes from the local Terosree Zamindari estate. The Hindu Zamindar was killed in the massacre.

History 
On 22 November 1971, Pakistan Army killed 43 people in Terosree village in Ghior Upazila, Manikganj District during Bangladesh Liberation war. The Pakistan Army was aided by the paramilitary Al-Badr (East Pakistan), Al-Shams, and Razakar. The Zamindar of Terosree Siddheswar Prasad Roy Chowdhury and the Principal of Terosree College Atiar Rahman was among those killed. 

Manikganj District will be captured by the Indian Army and the Mukti Bahini from the Pakistan Army on 13 December 1971.

Remembrance 
A monument has been constructed in Terosree village in memory of the victims. The Terosree Martyrs Memorial Committee carries out annual events marking the massacre with support from Someshwar Prasad Roy Chowdhury son of Siddheswar Prasad Roy Chowdhury.

References 

1971 in Bangladesh
Massacres in 1971
1971 in Pakistan
1971 Bangladesh genocide
Massacres of Bengali Hindus in East Pakistan
Persecution of Hindus
Persecution by Muslims
Massacres committed by Pakistan in East Pakistan
November 1971 events in Asia